Curanilahue is a Chilean commune and city in Arauco Province, Biobío Region. Its name comes from Mapundungun "Cura", meaning "Stone", and "Nilahue" meaning "Ford".

Demographics
Of these, 30,126 (94.3%) lived in urban areas and 1,817 (5.7%) in rural areas. Between the 1992 and 2002 censuses, the population fell by 5% (1,688 persons).

Administration
As a commune, Curanilahue is a third-level administrative division of Chile administered by a municipal council, headed by an alcalde who is directly elected every four years. The current alcalde (as of 2021) is  Alejandra Burgos Bizama.

Within the electoral divisions of Chile, Curanilahue is represented in the Chamber of Deputies by Manuel Monsalve (PS) and Iván Norambuena (UDI) as part of the 46th electoral district, together with Lota, Lebu, Arauco, Los Álamos, Cañete, Contulmo and Tirúa. The commune is represented in the Senate by Victor Pérez Varela (UDI) and Mariano Ruiz-Esquide Jara (PDC) as part of the 13th senatorial constituency (Biobío-Coast).

References

External links
  Municipality of Curanilahue

Communes of Chile
Populated places in Arauco Province